Stevens Building may refer to:

 Stevens' Building, Worcester, Massachusetts, United States
 Stevens Building (Portland, Oregon)
 Stevens Building (San Antonio, Texas)

See also
 Stevens House (disambiguation)
 Stevens School (disambiguation)
 Stevens High School (disambiguation)